Conway is a community in the Canadian province of Nova Scotia, located in  The Municipality of the District of Digby in Digby County .

Communities in Digby County, Nova Scotia
General Service Areas in Nova Scotia